Khadaki may refer to any of the following places in the Maharashtra state of India:

 Khadaki, Palghar district, a village
 Khadaki, Solapur district, a village
 Khadki, a locality in Pune district